This is a list of films which have placed number one at the weekly box office in France during 2012. The weeks start on Wednesdays, and finish on Tuesdays. The box-office number one is established in terms of tickets sold during the week.

References

See also
 Lists of highest-grossing films in France
 List of French films of 2012

France
2012 in French cinema
2012